The Illinois–Indiana men's basketball rivalry is an intra-Big Ten Conference, college sports rivalry between the Illinois Fighting Illini and Indiana Hoosiers.

History

Illinois and Indiana first met on January 20, 1906 with an Illinois victory, 27-24. Since the two teams are both in the Big Ten Conference, they meet at least once a season. The location of the game alternates between Simon Skjodt Assembly Hall in Bloomington and the State Farm Center, formerly Assembly Hall, in Champaign. There have been a total of five overtime games in this series.

In mid-1980s Indiana head coach Bob Knight brought allegations to the NCAA that Illinois assistant coaches had acted improperly in the recruitment of Lowell Hamilton. Hamilton was the focus of a recruiting competition between Illinois and Indiana, and while the allegations of improper conduct were unfounded by the NCAA, the controversy had some level of impact on the games at the time.

On March 10, 1991, after an Indiana victory in Champaign, a profanity-laced shouting match between Knight and Fighting Illini coach Lou Henson erupted outside the team locker rooms. The incident started when Knight left the Assembly Hall court with seven seconds remaining in the game, skipping the traditional postgame handshake while laughing and waving to the Illinois crowd. This incident enraged Henson to the point of confronting Knight outside of the locker room. Henson's anger continued as he spoke out against Knight at the postgame press conference.

In a game at Bloomington on February 25, 1998, Indiana head coach Bob Knight was issued two technical fouls by referee Ted Valentine for first arguing a call after a hard collision between Illinois guard Sergio McClain and Indiana guard Luke Recker in which McClain was issued a technical foul for touching the rim after blocking Recker's shot. Coach Knight argued the call should have been goaltending. From the collision, Recker fell hard to the court in pain. To check on his player, Coach Knight rushed to the court for which he was issued the second technical foul by Valentine.

Occasional feuds and incidents between the schools' programs have fueled the competition over the years. Illinois has dominated Indiana in the short history of the Big Ten tournament. Since the onset of the conference tournament, Illinois and Indiana have played a total of 9 times. Illinois holds the record of 6-3 over Indiana. In the 1999 Big Ten tournament the Hoosiers and the Illini faced each other and Illinois won the game 82-66. Illinois would go on to win 4 of the next 5 tournament meetings.

Another feud is less focused on the tension between the two schools, but rather a former Illinois head coach and his ties to Indiana. Bruce Weber coached the Fighting Illini from 2003–12, but the history between Weber and Indiana began before he set foot in Champaign. As head coach at Southern Illinois University for five years from 1998-2003, he scheduled some non-conference meetings against Indiana. Before that, Weber served as an assistant coach under Gene Keady at Purdue University for 18 years. During his tenure at Illinois, Weber noted that there was tension between himself and Indiana (see Indiana–Purdue rivalry).

In 2007 there was a recruiting battle between the schools over Indiana Mr. Basketball, Eric Gordon. Gordon initially verbally committed to play for Illinois. However, when Mike Davis resigned as Indiana's head coach and Kelvin Sampson was hired, Gordon decommitted and signed his National Letter of Intent to play for Indiana.

Accomplishments by the two rivals
The following summarizes the accomplishments of the two programs.

Through March 19, 2023

Game results

Games with both teams ranked
(Rankings are from AP Poll)

Winning team is shown. Ranking of the team at the time of the game by the AP poll is shown by the team name.

Series results

*Denotes game played during the Big Ten tournament

Series statistics  
 All-Time Series: Indiana leads 96-91
 Current Streak: Indiana, 3 wins
 Games at Illinois: Illinois leads 54-35
 Games at Indiana: Indiana leads 58-31
 Neutral Games: Illinois leads 6-3
 Illinois when ranked: 32-18
 Indiana when ranked: 40-21
 When both teams are ranked: Illinois leads 12-7
 Illinois when unranked: 59-78
 Indiana when unranked: 56-70
 Current Series Streak at Illinois: Indiana W-1
 Current Series Streak at Indiana: Indiana W-1
 Longest Illinois W-Streak: 8 (2/23/1912-1/23/1923)
 Longest Indiana W-Streak: 9 (2/22/1972-1/8/1977)
 Longest Illinois Home W-Streak: 11 (1/20/1906-1/17/1925)
 Longest Indiana Home W-Streak: 7 (1/27/2011-1/3/2019)
 Longest Illinois Road W-Streak: 3, three times (last, 2/29/1988-3/11/1990)
 Longest Indiana Road W-Streak: 4 (2/22/1972-1/17/1976)
 Largest Illinois Win Margin: 31 (76-45), 1/10/2009 at ILL
 Largest Illinois Road Win Margin: 24 (96-72), 1/14/1956
 Largest Indiana Win Margin: 40 (107-67), 2/19/1974 at IND
 Largest Indiana Road Win Margin: 28 (83-55), 1/17/1976
 In overtime games: Tied 3-3

References

College basketball rivalries in the United States
Big Ten Conference rivalries
Illinois Fighting Illini men's basketball
Indiana Hoosiers men's basketball